The 1989 Supercoppa Italiana was a match played by the 1988–89 Serie A winners Internazionale and 1988–89 Coppa Italia winners Sampdoria.  It took place on 29 November 1989 at the San Siro in Milan, Italy.  Inter won the match 2–0, to earn their first Supercoppa.

Match details 

1989
Supercoppa 1989
Supercoppa 1989
Supercoppa Italiana 1989